Dineutus is a genus of beetles in the family Gyrinidae, the whirligig beetles. They are 9 to 15 millimeters long. Their elytra are smooth, shallowly lined, or grooved.

Species include:

 Dineutus abyssinicus Régimbart, 1883
 Dineutus aegyptiacus (Dejean, 1836)
 Dineutus aereus (Klug in Ehrenberg, 1834)
 Dineutus amazonicus Hatch, 1930
 Dineutus americanus (Linnaeus, 1767)
 Dineutus analis Régimbart, 1883
 Dineutus angustus LeConte, 1878
 Dineutus arabicus Régimbart, 1907
 Dineutus archboldianus Ochs, 1955
 Dineutus assimilis Kirby, 1837
 Dineutus australis (Fabricius, 1775)
 Dineutus bechynei Ochs, 1958
 Dineutus brevis (Sturm, 1843)
 Dineutus buergersi Ochs, 1955
 Dineutus bufo Brinck, 1976
 Dineutus carolinus LeConte, 1868
 Dineutus cephalotes (Dejean, 1833)
 Dineutus chalybaeus Zimmermann, 1924
 Dineutus choiseulicola Brinck, 1976
 Dineutus ciliatus Forsberg, 1821
 Dineutus comma (Thunberg, 1781)
 Dineutus congolensis Ochs, 1937
 Dineutus cribratus Régimbart, 1886
 Dineutus cristobalensis Brinck, 1976
 Dineutus discolor Aubé, 1838
 Dineutus dispar Ochs, 1954
 Dineutus dispersus Brinck, 1976
 Dineutus dunkeri Zimmermann, 1920
 Dineutus eccentricus Mouchamps, 1956
 Dineutus emarginatus (Say, 1823)
 Dineutus fairmairei Régimbart, 1883
 Dineutus fauveli Régimbart, 1884
 Dineutus freyi Ochs, 1954
 Dineutus gondaricus Reiche, 1847
 Dineutus gouldi Hope, 1842
 Dineutus grandis (Klug in Ehrenberg, 1834)
 Dineutus grossus (Modeer, 1776)
 Dineutus helleri Ochs, 1925
 Dineutus heterandrus Ochs, 1937
 Dineutus heurni Zimmermann, 1924
 Dineutus himalayensis Guignot, 1945
 Dineutus hornii Roberts, 1895
 Dineutus impiger Guignot, 1947
 Dineutus indicans Walker, 1858
 Dineutus indicus Aubé, 1838
 Dineutus indus (Fabricius, 1798)
 Dineutus insignis Heer, 1862
 Dineutus iridescens Kirsch, 1865
 Dineutus jikeli Schaufuss, 1890
 Dineutus kuntzeni Ochs, 1924
 Dineutus lateristriatus (Sturm, 1843)
 Dineutus lethicus Guignot, 1957
 Dineutus longimanus Olivier, 1795
 Dineutus longiventris Heer, 1862
 Dineutus loriae Régimbart, 1899
 Dineutus macrochirus Régimbart, 1899
 Dineutus major (Dejean, 1833)
 Dineutus mellyi Régimbart, 1883
 Dineutus mesosternalis Régimbart, 1907
 Dineutus metallicus (Dejean, 1833)
 Dineutus micans (Fabricius, 1792)
 Dineutus mucronatus (Sturm, 1843)
 Dineutus neobritannicus Ochs, 1925
 Dineutus neoguineensis Régimbart, 1892
 Dineutus neohollandicus Ochs, 1926
 Dineutus nigrior Roberts, 1895
 Dineutus orientalis (Modeer, 1776)
 Dineutus pagdeni Ochs, 1937
 Dineutus pauliani Guignot, 1942
 Dineutus pectoralis Régimbart, 1882
 Dineutus picipes Waterhouse, 1876
 Dineutus politus Macleay, 1825
 Dineutus productus Roberts, 1895
 Dineutus proximus (Dejean, 1836)
 Dineutus proximus Aubé, 1838
 Dineutus punctatus Aubé, 1838
 Dineutus punctulatus (Dejean, 1833)
 Dineutus regimbarti Régimbart, 1882
 Dineutus ritsemae Régimbart, 1882
 Dineutus robertsi Leng, 1911
 Dineutus rossi Ochs, 1933
 Dineutus rufipes (Dejean, 1833)
 Dineutus serrulatus LeConte, 1868
 Dineutus sharpi Régimbart, 1883
 Dineutus shorti Gustafson and Sites, 2016
 Dineutus simmondsi Ochs, 1927
 Dineutus sinensis Feng, 1935
 Dineutus sinuaticollis Zimmermann, 1924
 Dineutus sinuosipennis Laporte de Castelnau, 1840
 Dineutus solitarius Aubé, 1838
 Dineutus spinosus Fabricius, 1781
 Dineutus staudingeri Ochs, 1924
 Dineutus striatus Zimmermann, 1916
 Dineutus sublineatus (Chevrolat, 1833)
 Dineutus subspinosus (Klug in Ehrenberg, 1834)
 Dineutus sumbaensis (Ochs, 1953)
 Dineutus tetracanthus Régimbart, 1917
 Dineutus truncatus Sharp, 1873
 Dineutus unicolor Ochs, 1960
 Dineutus unidentatus Aubé, 1838
 Dineutus varians (Dejean, 1833)
 Dineutus violaceus Ochs, 1955
 Dineutus virescens Ochs, 1955
 Dineutus wehnckei Régimbart, 1883
 Dineutus wittei Ochs, 1933

References

External links
Dineutus at ITIS

Gyrinidae
Adephaga genera
Taxa named by William Sharp Macleay